The 8 Learning Management Questions (or 8 LMQs) are a set of questions developed in and primarily used in Australia for teacher training and curriculum development. This set of sequential design based questions guides teachers through the process of developing a teaching plan for their classrooms, with an emphasis on reaching intended learning outcomes in all students. The process is focused on enabling teachers to translate teaching theory into practice. 

The questions were developed by David E. Lynch in 1998. The 8 questions, which are organised into three design phases, are answered in their numerical sequence. The 8 Learning Management Questions underpin teacher training at Central Queensland University and Charles Darwin University in Australia and inform teaching in the Northern Territory.

The 8 LMQs have two key purposes. Firstly, they act as a ‘professional knowledge organiser’. This means the 8 LMQs enable the teacher to identify and then organise the fundamental consideration, or elements, required for the successful development and execution of learning experiences, units of work or individual lessons. For the student-teacher the 8LMQs act as a ‘knowledge organiser’ whereby essential professional knowledge, learnt as part of their preparation program, is organized such that they have a bank of ‘considerations’ that they can call upon as they engage with each question. By this is meant the teacher education program should be presented so as to inform each LMQ. This has the effect of providing the student-teacher with a ‘ready-reference’ arrangement of knowledge that they can draw upon and unpack when designing and then executing successful learning experiences. The second purpose of the 8LMQs is to transition ‘teaching’ from ‘teacher centred activities’ to a more responsive ‘student-centred learning' approaches. The 8 LMQs are therefore a deliberate strategy to draw the teacher to the nuances of each student and away from ‘the one-size-fits all’ approaches that are characteristic of ‘teaching’ and ‘curriculum planning’ and lesson planning.

OUTCOMES PHASE LMQ1: What have my students achieved to date? 

LMQ2: What do I do to help my students achieve  the objectives of the lesson better and faster? 

STRATEGY PHASE LMQ3: How do my students best learn?

LMQ4: What resources do I have at my disposal?

LMQ5: What are my teaching strategies?

LMQ6: Who will participate in which aspect to support the teaching strategy?

EVIDENCE PHASE LMQ7: How will I check that students have achieved the defined learning outcomes?

LMQ8: How will I report student progress?

The 8 LMQs are underpinned by the Dimensions of Learning (DoL) pedagogic framework. DoL provides a bank of evidence-based teaching strategies for developing and delivering specific learning experiences or lessons. These are a series of ‘step-by-step’ teaching strategies that have been confirmed by research as underpinning successful learning experiences.

The reference to learning management is strategic as the questions were developed as a subset of the learning management teaching knowledge base.

References

Sources
Lynch, DE 2012, Preparing teachers in times of change: teaching school, standards, new content and evidence, Primrose Hall Publishing Group, Brisbane, Qld.
Lynch, D & Smith, R 2006, 'The learning management design process', in R Smith & D Lynch (eds), The rise of the learning manager: changing teacher education, Pearson Education Australia, Frenchs Forest, NSW, pp. 53–67.
Lynch, D, & Smith, R 2011, Designing the classroom curriculum in the knowledge age, AACLM Press, Brisbane, Qld
Lynch, D & Smith, R 2012, Assessing and reporting the classroom curriculum in the knowledge age, Primrose Hall Publishing Group, Tarragindi, Qld.
Allen, J.M. (2009). Valuing practice over theory: How beginning teachers re-orient their practice in the transition from the university to the workplace. Teaching and Teacher Education, Volume 25, Issue 5, July 2009, Pages 647–654
Knight, Cecily (2010) Resilience education and the learning management process. In: The Theory and Practice of Learning Management. Pearson Education Australia, Frenchs' Forest, NSW Australia, pp. 136–146.

Educational materials